Everybody's Entitled to Their Own Opinion is the debut album by the Berkeley, California punk rock band The Mr. T Experience. It was released in 1986 by Disorder Records. The album established the band's presence in the prolific San Francisco Bay Area music scene of the late 1980s and the 1990s. Lookout! Records re-released the album in 1990 and again in 1995.

Production
The album was recorded and mixed in one day.

Critical reception
Trouser Press called the album "sloppy mid-tempo punk that leaves tunefulness a goal more than an actual quality." The East Bay Express wrote that it revels "in dopey pop culture."

Track listing

Performers
Dr. Frank - vocals, guitar
Jon Von Zelowitz - vocals, guitar
Byron Stamatatos - bass
Alex Laipeneiks - drums

References

The Mr. T Experience albums
1986 debut albums